The Herndon House was a hotel in Omaha, Nebraska.

Herndon House or Herndon Home may also refer to:

Elijah Herndon House, a house in California, Kentucky
Herndon Home, a house in Atlanta, Georgia
Herndon Homes, a former housing project in Atlanta